Reindert is a Frisian Dutch male given name, related to the German name Reinhard.

Notable people with this name include:
 Reindert Brasser (1912–1999), Dutch athlete
 Reindert de Favauge (1872–1949), Dutch sport shooter
 Reindert de Waal (1904–1985), Dutch field hockey player, better known as Rein de Waal

See also
 Reinder, Dutch male given name

References

Dutch masculine given names
Lists of people by given name